Grant Lillard (born December 5, 1995) is an American professional soccer player who plays as a defender.

Early life

Youth
Lillard moved to Hinsdale, Illinois and enrolled at Hinsdale Central, playing soccer for the Chicago Fire Academy (U16 and U18). While living in Arizona, he played soccer for the Scottsdale Soccer Club 96 Blackhawks, winning Arizona State Championships in 2009, 2010, and 2011. One of his close childhood friends is Ryan Scales. Scales was one of the all-time leading scorers for the Hinsdale Central High School Men's Basketball program.

College
Lillard attended Indiana University, where he played college soccer as a center back for the Hoosiers from 2014–2017, tallying a total of 14 goals and 9 assists in 86 appearances. During his time at Indiana, Lillard was a three-time First-Team All-Big Ten, Big Ten Defensive Player of the Year, and a First-Team All-American.

Professional career

Chicago Fire
On January 10, 2018, Lillard signed a one-year contract with Chicago Fire as a Homegrown Player, with options for the 2019 and 2020 seasons.

Lillard made his professional debut on April 7, 2018 as a 64th minute substitution in a 1–0 win over the Columbus Crew SC. He made his first professional start on April 14, 2018 in a 1–0 loss to the LA Galaxy.

Inter Miami
On November 14, 2019, Lillard was traded to Inter Miami in exchange for $75,000 in General Allocation Money.

Columbus Crew
On August 14, 2020, Lillard was traded to Columbus Crew in exchange for a third round 2021 MLS SuperDraft pick. Lillard failed to make a single appearance during the 2020 season for Columbus, however, he was part of the squad that won the 2020 MLS Cup. On December 14, 2020, Columbus announced that it had exercised Lillard's option for the 2021 season. Following the 2021 season, Columbus opted to decline their contract option on Lillard.

Loudoun United
On January 28, 2022, Lillard signed with USL Championship side Loudoun United, the lower-league affiliate of D.C. United.

Career statistics

Club

Honors 
Indiana University
 Sigma Chi Fraternity: 2018
Columbus Crew
 MLS Cup: 2020
 Campeones Cup: 2021

References

External links 
 
 

1995 births
Living people
American soccer players
Association football defenders
Chicago Fire FC players
Columbus Crew players
Indiana Hoosiers men's soccer players
Lansing Ignite FC players
Loudoun United FC players
Inter Miami CF players
Homegrown Players (MLS)
Major League Soccer players
People from Hinsdale, Illinois
Soccer players from Illinois
Sportspeople from Cook County, Illinois
Sportspeople from DuPage County, Illinois
USL League Two players
All-American men's college soccer players
USL League One players